Maria Cassandra Hannele Korhonen (born 1 January 1998) is a Swedish football player who last played for Portuguese club Benfica as a forward.

References

External links 
 

 Instagram

1998 births
Living people
Women's association football forwards
Swedish women's footballers
S.L. Benfica (women) footballers
Campeonato Nacional de Futebol Feminino players
Swedish expatriate women's footballers
Swedish expatriate sportspeople in Portugal
Expatriate women's footballers in Portugal
IK Uppsala Fotboll players
Elitettan players
Sweden women's youth international footballers
Kansallinen Liiga players
Swedish expatriate sportspeople in Finland
Expatriate women's footballers in Finland
Sportspeople from Västerås
Gideonsbergs IF players